This is a list of British bingo nicknames. In the game of bingo in the United Kingdom, callers announcing the numbers have traditionally used some nicknames to refer to particular numbers if they are drawn. The nicknames are sometimes known by the rhyming phrase 'bingo lingo' and there are rhymes for each number from 1 to 90, some of which date back many decades. In some clubs, the 'bingo caller' will say the number, with the assembled players intoning the rhyme in a call and response manner, in others, the caller will say the rhyme and the players chant the number. In 2003, Butlins holiday camps introduced some more modern calls devised by a Professor of Popular Culture in an attempt to bring fresh interest to bingo.

Calls

References

Citations

Sources

Bingo
Lists of slang
Bingo,British
Bingo Nicknames